The Western Qin (385–400, 409–431) was a dynastic state of China ruled by the Xianbei ethnicity during the era of Sixteen Kingdoms. All rulers of the Western Qin declared themselves "wang", translatable as either "king" or "prince." They ruled an area corresponding to modern-day southwestern Gansu in Northwest China.

Rulers of the Western Qin

The family tree of Western Qin rulers

See also
Xianbei
List of past Chinese ethnic groups
Wu Hu

References

 
385 establishments
400 disestablishments
States and territories established in the 400s
409 establishments
431 disestablishments
Dynasties in Chinese history
Former countries in Chinese history
4th-century establishments in China
5th-century establishments in China
5th-century disestablishments in China